Bull Moose is an independent retailer and record store chain based in Portland, Maine, USA. The chain has operated since 1989 and has eight locations in Maine and three in New Hampshire.

History 
Bull Moose was founded by Brett Wickard in Brunswick, Maine in 1989, though he did not file it as a Business Corporation until 1995. Bull Moose was started with $37,000. Chris Brown was hired in 1991 as a clerk and later became the creator of Record Store Day, and the company's Vice President.

They were covered by Bloomberg for using predictive algorithms to drive media sales. 

On January 4, 2022, it was announced that Bull Moose would be sold to its 140 employees. Founder Brett Wickard will stay on as interim CEO and chair of the board during the transition. In January of 2022, Bull Moose became 100% employee-owned and created an employee stock ownership plan for its over 170 employees across 11 stores. 

In May of 2022, Bull Moose named Shawn Nichols as its new President and CEO, with Wickard remaining on as Chairman

In December 2022 it was announced that the Bull Moose Sanford location would be closing and that a new location would be opened in Biddeford Maine. The new store is scheduled to open in early 2023. Bull Moose had previously occupied the Sanford location for 25 years.

Record Store Day 
In 2007, when Brown was head of Bull Moose marketing, an email chain with Michael Kurtz, head of the Department of Record Stores, sparked the idea for Record Store Day. Each year the co-founders at the Department of Record Stores collaborate with multiple artists for exclusive releases made especially for Record Store Day. The releases for 2017 included works from David Bowie, Prince, St. Vincent, and more. The Department of Record Stores keeps a list of participating independent record stores.

LEGO Fire Walk 
The Bull Moose Facebook account posted an image of a LEGO Fire Walk they created at the South Portland, ME based store to promote sales of The LEGO Movie on June 19, 2014. It was shared by famous Star Trek actor George Takei, and subsequently went viral. It was also covered by local news.

Music Events 
Bull Moose is locally known for their in-store music events with musicians like The Decemberists, Mumford and Sons, and Wilco.

Bull Moose has hosted the following artists:

References 

Music retailers of the United States
Companies based in Portland, Maine
Companies based in New Hampshire
1989 establishments in Maine
Retail companies established in 1989
Independent stores
Music industry